Narodowiec was a Polish-language socialist daily newspaper published from Lens in France in 1924–1989. Before the World War II, it had a circulation of up to 40,000 and was seen as the largest Polish language newspaper in France. As of 1960 had a circulation of around 40,000.
This newspaper was first established in Herne by Michal Franciszek Kwiatkowski and the first edition was issued on 2 October 1909.

References

 Narodowiec at WIEM Encyklopedia

Polish-language newspapers
Defunct newspapers published in France
France–Poland relations
Socialism in France
Socialist newspapers